Evan Louro (born January 19, 1996) is an American soccer player who plays as a goalkeeper for FC Cincinnati in Major League Soccer.

Career

Youth
Louro attended St. John Vianney High School in Holmdel Township, New Jersey, prior to his three-year career at the University of Michigan. During his time with the Wolverines soccer team, Louro played in 46 matches, earning 12 shutouts. He was also a member of the New York Red Bulls Academy for seven years during his youth, and helped lead the Red Bulls to the U16 Generation Adidas MLS Cup in 2011.

While in college, Louro made his semi-professional debut for Detroit City FC in a 2–2 draw against the Michigan Stars FC in 2016. He was voted "Man of the Match" on May 12, 2016, for his penalty-saving heroics against the Michigan Bucks in the U.S. Open Cup. He also played in the Premier Development League for New York Red Bulls U-23.

Professional
Louro signed a homegrown contract with the New York Red Bulls in MLS on January 23, 2017. The signing made him the second ever homegrown goalkeeper in the club's history after Santiago Castaño. On April 1, 2017, Louro made his professional debut for New York Red Bulls II, recording a shut out in a 1–0 victory over Richmond Kickers.

Louro joined the Tampa Bay Rowdies on January 21, 2020. In 2021, Louro won the USL Championship Golden Glove, having recorded a 0.74 goals against average and posting 14 shutouts. Following the 2021 season it was announced that Louro would leave the Rowdies.

Following a long injury rehabilitation, Louro signed with Major League Soccer side FC Cincinnati on August 22, 2022.

Personal life
Louro was born to a Spanish father and an American mother of Spanish-Argentine descent.

Career statistics

Honors

Club
New York Red Bulls
MLS Supporters' Shield (1): 2018

Tampa Bay Rowdies
2021 USL Championship Goalkeeper of the Year

References

External links
 

1996 births
Living people
American soccer players
American people of Spanish descent
American people of Argentine descent
Michigan Wolverines men's soccer players
Detroit City FC players
New York Red Bulls U-23 players
New York Red Bulls players
New York Red Bulls II players
Tampa Bay Rowdies players
FC Cincinnati players
Soccer players from New Jersey
USL League Two players
National Premier Soccer League players
People from South River, New Jersey
Sportspeople from Middlesex County, New Jersey
St. John Vianney High School (New Jersey) alumni
USL Championship players
Association football goalkeepers
Homegrown Players (MLS)
MLS Next Pro players